The 2017–18 Borussia Dortmund season was the 109th season in the football club's history and 42nd consecutive and 51st overall season in the top flight of German football, the Bundesliga, having been promoted from the 2. Bundesliga Nord in 1976.

In addition to the domestic league, Borussia Dortmund also participated in this season's editions of the domestic cup, the DFB-Pokal, and the first-tier continental cup, the UEFA Champions League. Dortmund were the reigning DFB-Pokal champions, and therefore also participated in the German super cup, the DFL-Supercup. This was the 44th season for Dortmund in the Signal Iduna Park, located in Dortmund, North Rhine-Westphalia, Germany. The season covered a period from 1 July 2017 to 30 June 2018.

Kit information
Supplier: Puma /
Sponsor: Evonik Industries

Players

Squad information

Transfers

In

Out

Friendly matches

Competitions

Overview

Bundesliga

League table

Results summary

Results by round

Matches

DFB-Pokal

DFL-Supercup

UEFA Champions League

Group stage

UEFA Europa League

Knockout phase

Round of 32

Round of 16

Statistics

Appearances and goals

|-
! colspan=16 style=background:#dcdcdc; text-align:center| Goalkeepers

|-
! colspan=16 style=background:#dcdcdc; text-align:center| Defenders

|-
! colspan=16 style=background:#dcdcdc; text-align:center| Midfielders

|-
! colspan=16 style=background:#dcdcdc; text-align:center| Forwards

|-
! colspan=16 style=background:#dcdcdc; text-align:center| Players transferred out during the season

Goalscorers

Clean sheets

Last updated: 5 May 2018

Notes

References

Borussia Dortmund seasons
Dortmund, Borussia
Borussia Dortmund
Borussia Dortmund